Provirus silencing, or proviral silencing, is the repression of expression of proviral genes in cells.

A provirus is a viral DNA that has been incorporated into the chromosome of a host cell, often by retroviruses such as HIV.

Endogenous retroviruses are always in the provirus state in the host cell and replicate through reverse transcription. By integrating their genome into the host cell genome, they make use of the host cell's transcription and translation mechanisms to achieve their own propagation. This often leads to harmful impact on the host. However, in recent gene therapy techniques, retroviruses are often used to deliver desired genes instead of their own viral genome into the host genome. As such, we are interested in the host cell's mechanisms to silence such gene expressions to find out firstly, how the host cell manages provirus transcription to eliminate the deleterious effects of retroviruses; and secondly, how can we ensure stable and long term expression of retrovirus-mediated gene transfer.

It has been found that the level transcription of integrated retroviruses depends on both genetic and chromatin remodeling at the site of integration. Mechanisms such as DNA methylation and histone modification seem to play important roles in the suppression provirus transcription, such that proviral activity can be finally silenced.

References

Genetic engineering
Viral genes